Shenay Perry (born July 6, 1984) is a retired tennis player from the U.S. She is the current coach of professional tennis player Kristie Ahn.

Shenay's career-high singles ranking of No. 40 she reached on August 28, 2006. Her career-high doubles ranking of No. 97, she achieved on December 8, 2003. Shenay won nine singles and seven doubles ITF titles in her career.

She retired from professional tennis in September 2010.

ITF Circuit finals

Singles: 10 (9 titles, 1 runner-up)

Doubles: 13 (7 titles, 6 runner-ups)

External links
 
 

Living people
1984 births
African-American female tennis players
American female tennis players
Tennis people from Washington, D.C.
Sportspeople from Coral Springs, Florida
21st-century African-American sportspeople
21st-century African-American women
20th-century African-American people
Tennis players from Washington, D.C.
Sports coaches from Washington, D.C.
20th-century African-American women